Polissena Contarini Da Mula was a Dogaressa of Venice by marriage to the Doge Alvise Giovanni Mocenigo (r. 1763-1779).

She married the Doge in 1771 at a very young age, though she does not seem to have played to part of dogaressa in a ceremonial sense as much as did her predecessor Pisana Cornaro. She was, however, the center of the literary circle her consort gathered on his private country villa, where she became the object and muse of many poets. There, Carlo Gozzi prepared comic plays for the little theatre of the Palace.

References 
 Staley, Edgcumbe:  The dogaressas of Venice : The wives of the doges, London : T. W. Laurie, 1910
 Louisa Lauw: The Dogaressa

Dogaressas of Venice
Polissena
18th-century Venetian women